Zaneta Skowronska (born 11 October 1979 in Zakrzów, Kędzierzyn-Koźle County, Poland) is a Polish dressage rider. Representing Poland, she competed at two World Equestrian Games (in 2006 and 2014) and at four European Dressage Championships (in 2005, 2013, 2015 and 2021).

Her current best championship result is 12th places in team dressage at the 2005 European Championships and 2006 World Equestrian Games, while her current best individual result is 45th place from the 2015 European Championships.

References

External links
 

Living people
1979 births
Polish female equestrians
Polish dressage riders
People from Kędzierzyn-Koźle County